Wayne Bird (born 21 July 1966) is a South African cricketer. He played in one List A match for Boland in 1992/93.

References

External links
 

1966 births
Living people
South African cricketers
Boland cricketers
Cricketers from Cape Town